The Michael McIntyre Chat Show is a comedy chat show presented by Michael McIntyre. It aired on BBC One from 10 March 2014 until 25 December of the same year.

Episodes

Series overview

Series 1

Very Christmassy Christmas Show
This was a Christmas special which took place in a different set with a slightly different format to the other episodes. The length of the episode was longer than the regular episodes being 60 minutes, rather than 45 minutes. The show started with McIntyre doing a short stand-up act, before guests came on and Michael cooked with Jamie Oliver in the kitchen. The show ended with McIntyre and the other guests singing a Christmas carol together.

Cancelled series 2
It was confirmed at the end of the first series that the show will return for a second series. Although it was later stated that a second series would not happen.

Opening Sequence
The first, second and fifth episodes include Michael going over to the right of the set and starts talking to Paul (the guy who pulls up the gauze) and would then go to the opening sequence. All other episodes (third, fourth and sixth) just go straight to the opening sequence. In the opening sequence the camera first goes over this door which says on air and then goes over the audience and around the studio which zoom's into the T.V. and the announcer reveals the guests as shown on the screen. Michael enters from the gauze and the show starts.

Send to All
McIntyre takes an audience member's phone and sends a text message to everyone in their contacts and throughout the show he reads their replies. At the end of the show the phone is returned and gives a special 'Send to All' telephone. In the first episode, McIntyre also sent a text at the end saying this has all been a joke by himself and included a selfie. The game was not played in fourth episode and was left unexplained why. In the sixth episode James Corden played the game on McIntyre's phone, whilst McIntyre sent a message on Corden's phone. 'Send to All' continued for McIntyre's following Saturday Night show Michael McIntyre's Big Show with celebrities taking part.

List of Send to All Texts in Series 1

Set
The set features a dark wood desk, leather chair for guests, and a TV, sitting on blue rimmed red carpet. Guests enter from the left, with McIntyre entering from a gauze at the right.

The set was very different for the Christmas episode. It consisted of a leather chair and couch. A front door where the guests would enter from. There was a kitchen to the right of the set where the Christmas cooking was done.

Reception
On average, the debut season of the show pulled in an average of 2.05 million viewers (excluding iPlayer catch-up and downloads). During the  first series, it was alleged that the show was facing the  axe;  with McIntyre apparently claiming that he felt "uncomfortable" with the chat show format.

References

External links

2014 British television series debuts
2014 British television series endings
BBC television comedy
BBC television talk shows
English-language television shows